Karasimovo (Qarasim) is a rural locality (a village) in Bolsheshadinsky Selsoviet, Mishkinsky District, Bashkortostan, Russia. The population was 115 as of 2010. There are 3 streets.

Geography 
Karasimovo is located 17 km north of Mishkino (the district's administrative centre) by road. Ishtybayevo is the nearest rural locality.

References 

Rural localities in Mishkinsky District